This is the list of mayors of the City of Ipswich in Queensland, Australia.

Prior to 1921, mayors were elected on an annual basis from amongst the councillors, as follows:

From 1921, mayors were elected for 3 year terms.

References

Mayors
Ipswich
Mayors Ipswich